"10 Out of 10" is the debut single by South Korean boy band 2PM. It premiered digitally on August 29, 2008, and was released as an CD single in South Korea, titled "Hottest Time of the Day", on September 4, 2008, via JYP Entertainment. The release is supported by the B-side tracks "Only You" and "Angel".

Background
The song runs 3 minutes and 27 seconds in length. It features Jaebeom as the lead rapper. The song is about an attractive woman, who is considered a "10 out of 10" in terms of attractiveness. The song describes various aspects of her that are considered "10 points".

Music video
The teaser for the music video was released on August 26. The video, directed by Jang Jae-hyuk, starts with a woman, played by G.NA, pulling up and exiting a car. She walks through a building, and the members of 2PM stare at her as she walks by. The remainder of the video intersperses scenes of the band dancing with videos about their interest in the woman. The dancing scenes place in a reflective stage, with a crystal-like background.

Some scenes use humor to illustrate the band's fantasies or delusions about the woman. For example, at one point Wooyoung is initially eating whipped cream off the woman's finger; however, a later scene shows him with Jun. K's finger in his mouth. Another scene shows Junho playing with Taecyeon at the pool, until he realizes Taecyeon is not the woman. Near the end of the video, the woman walks away with a man, possibly her boyfriend. The members of 2PM look on with disappointment as the pair walk away.

Commercial performance
"10 Out of 10" charted on the September 2008 issue of the MIAK monthly albums chart at number 36, selling 6,332 copies. It was the final MIAK album chart issue released before it was replaced by the Gaon Album Chart starting in January 2010.

Charts

Track listing
South Korean CD single
 "10 Out of 10" (10점 만점에 10점; 10 Points Out of 10 Points) – 3:22
 "Only You" – 3:58
 "Angel" – 3:54
 "10 Out of 10" (Old School version) – 3:17
 "10 Out of 10" (Instrumental) – 3:23
 "Only You" (Instrumental) – 3:58

Release history

References

2PM songs
2008 singles
2008 songs
JYP Entertainment singles
Songs written by Park Jin-young
Kakao M singles